The Chief Election Commissioner and Other Election Commissioners Appointment Act, 2022 in Bangladesh is an Act passed in the Jatiya Sangsad on 26 January 2022. Provision has been made in this Act for the appointment of Chief Election Commissioner and other Election Commissioners as described in Article 118 (1) of the Constitution of Bangladesh. This is the first such law after the independence of Bangladesh. At the same time, this is the first law of Jatiya Sangsad in 2022. Bangladesh Nationalist Party, the main opposition party compared it to BaKSAL.

References 

2022 in Bangladesh
Law of Bangladesh